Marvin Howard "Baby Face" Breuer (April 29, 1914 – January 17, 1991) was a pitcher in Major League Baseball. He played for the New York Yankees from 1939 to 1943.

In the 1941 World Series, Breuer came on as a reliever in the fifth inning of Game 4 to relieve Atley Donald, with the Yankees losing 4–3. Breuer pitched three scoreless innings, which enabled the Yankees to ultimately win the game on a passed ball by Mickey Owen. Breuer also pitched in the 1942 World Series, which the Yankees lost to the St. Louis Cardinals.

After Breuer's playing career ended, he spent 31 years working for the United States Geological Survey until his retirement in 1976. He was survived by his wife, Dorothy, two children, three grandchildren, and three great-grandchildren.

Breuer earned a Bachelor of Science degree in civil engineering from the Missouri School of Mines in 1935 and after his baseball career, worked for the United States Geological Survey until retiring in 1976.

References

External links

KC Blues minor league team info, including a paragraph on Breuer

1914 births
1991 deaths
Major League Baseball pitchers
New York Yankees players
Baseball players from Missouri
People from Rolla, Missouri
Joplin Miners players
Kansas City Blues (baseball) players
Missouri University of Science and Technology alumni
Newark Bears (IL) players
Oakland Oaks (baseball) players